Sarıhacılar, Akseki is a village in the District of Akseki, Antalya Province, Turkey.

References

Gallery 

Villages in Akseki District